Kaleidoscope is the debut studio album by American singer Kelis. It was released on December 7, 1999, by Virgin Records, and was produced entirely by the Neptunes. Despite underperforming in the United States, the album saw mild success in certain international markets, including the United Kingdom, where it charted at number 43 and was certified gold.

Kaleidoscope was reissued on February 21, 2020, in celebration of its 20th anniversary. The extended digital release features edits and club remixes, including a Neptunes extended remix of "Caught Out There". The physical edition was pressed to translucent orange vinyl and was released in a two-set on March 6, 2020.

Critical reception

Kaleidoscope received widespread acclaim from music critics. AllMusic editor Jaime Sunao Ikeda rated the album four and a half out of five stars and remarked that 'the album "showcases the development of a great talent [...] It's when Kelis and her production team create tracks that best fit her voice and uniqueness that the end results are outstanding. Although comparisons to Neneh Cherry are inevitable, she does carve out a niche for herself, armed with undeniable talent." NME called Kaleidoscope a "futuristic, visionary, multi-layered work of R&B, funk, soul and rap, furnished with an inspirational, psychedelic spirituality, rarely seen but desperately needed in these cynical times" and concluded: "Uplifting, magical, genre-bending music, if there’s a better debut album this year, bring it on. We need more like this." Q magazine's Kerry Potter described Kaleidoscope as "an album that packs punches of the Mike Tyson variety and oozes confidence from every beat [...] Kaleidoscope isn't just a promising debut, it's an inspired one."

Entertainment Weeklys Britt Robson found that the album "fleshes out her persona with petulant sass and roller-rink whimsy, pegging her romantic maturity halfway between Brandy and Mary J. But what lingers are the minimalist staccato beats from production duo The Neptunes." Rolling Stone critic Arion Berger wrote that Kaleidoscope was "too musically adventurous and emotionally ambivalent to employ any one attitude. Plumbing retro styles is the easy resort of the hip-hop eclecticist, but somehow Kelis' background in jazz, gospel, rock and R&B; brings a deeply felt sonic futurism to her debut album [...] The Neptunes makes this interplanetary power-girl mix sound both danceably down-to-earth and shockingly new." In 2020, the magazine ranked the album at number 391 on their updated list of the "500 Greatest Albums of All Time".

Commercial performance and singles
Kaleidoscope peaked at number 144 on the Billboard 200, and as of November 2006, it had sold 249,000 copies in the United States. The album fared better in Europe, where all three singles—"Caught Out There", "Good Stuff", and "Get Along with You"—attained moderate commercial success. Kaleidoscope reached number 43 on the UK Albums Chart and was certified gold by the British Phonographic Industry (BPI). By October 2004, the album had sold 167,000 copies in the United Kingdom.

After reaching number 52 on the UK Singles Chart on imports alone, "Caught Out There" was given a proper release in the UK, eventually peaking at number four. "Good Stuff" also proved a modest success, reaching number 19 on the UK chart. The third and final single from the album, "Get Along with You", was her first solo release to miss the top 40, reaching number 51.

In an interview with The Guardian in January 2020, Kelis stated that she never earned any money from sales of her first two albums, adding that she was "blatantly lied to and tricked" by the production team with whom she had signed, at the age of 19.

Track listing

Sample credits
 "Ghetto Children" contains elements from "Hey Young World" by Slick Rick.

Personnel
Credits adapted from the liner notes of Kaleidoscope.

Musicians
 Kelis – vocals
 The Neptunes – instruments, arrangements
 Terrar – vocals 
 Markita – vocals 
 Marc Dorsey – vocals 
 N.E.R.D – vocals 
 Justin Vince – vocals 
 Nicole Wray – background vocals 
 Kenny Wray – background vocals

Technical
 The Neptunes – production, executive production
 Dave Hummel – engineering
 Andrew Coleman – engineering
 Şerban Ghenea – mixing 
 Ken "Duro" Ifill – mixing 
 Rob Walker – executive production

Artwork
 Len Peltier – art direction
 A³DTB / D Thom Bissett – design
 Me Company – hummingbird character and logo
 Jonathan Mannion – photography
 Steven Klein – photography

Charts

Certifications

Release history

Notes

References

1999 debut albums
Albums produced by the Neptunes
Kelis albums
Virgin Records albums